Alexander Jean is an American music duo made up of singers Mark Ballas and BC Jean. The name for the duo is a combination of their two middle names. Ballas and Jean first met in 2012. Ballas was performing in a band while Jean was performing her own material. They became an official music duo in 2015. They also married each other in November 2016.

Their debut single was "Roses and Violets". It reached the top 20 on Billboards Bubbling Under Hot 100 chart. Alexander Jean were picked in November 2018 as Elvis Duran's Artist of the Month. The duo was featured on NBC's Today show, hosted by Hoda Kotb and Kathie Lee Gifford, broadcast nationally in the United States where they performed a live version of their single "Waiting for You".

Members

Mark Ballas
Mark Alexander Ballas Jr. (born May 24, 1986) is a British/American  singer-songwriter, musician, critically acclaimed professional dancer, choreographer and actor. He played Charlie Price in the 2012 Broadway musical Kinky Boots and played Frankie Valli in the Broadway musical Jersey Boys.

BC Jean
Brittany Jean Carlson (born April 22, 1987), better known by her stage name BC Jean, is an American singer-songwriter and actress, perhaps best known for writing the song "If I Were a Boy" which was later sung by Beyoncé and achieved worldwide commercial success.

Discography

EPs
2016: Head High
2017: High Enough
2021: Coming Down

Singles
2016: "Roses and Violets"
2016: "So Bad"
2017: "Paper Planes"
2017: "We Three Kings" (feat. Casey Abrams)
2018: "Stampede" (feat. Lindsey Stirling)
2018: "Waiting for You"
2019: "O Holy Night"
2020: "For Anybody Wondering"
2020: "Nevermind"
2020: "Highs & Lows"
2020: “God Rest You Merry, Gentlemen”

References

External links
Official website
Facebook

Musical groups established in 2015
American pop music groups 
American musical duos
2015 establishments in California